Barbára Sól Gísladóttir (born 26 March 2001) is an Icelandic footballer who plays as a midfielder for Brøndby, on loan from Selfoss, and the Iceland women's national team.

Career
Gísladóttir has been capped for the Iceland national team. She earned her first call up to the national team in September 2020 after being selected by then-manager Jón Þór Hauksson.

References

Gisladottir, Barbara Sol
Gisladottir, Barbara Sol
Gisladottir, Barbara Sol
Icelandic women's footballers
Iceland women's international footballers
Selfoss women's football players
Brøndby IF (women) players
Icelandic expatriate footballers
Expatriate women's footballers in Denmark
Icelandic expatriate sportspeople in Denmark
Úrvalsdeild kvenna (football) players